Aleksandr Nedovyesov was the defending champion, but lost in the quarterfinals to Błażej Koniusz.

Dustin Brown won the title, defeating Jan-Lennard Struff 6–4, 6–3 in the final.

Seeds

Draw

Finals

Top half

Bottom half

References
 Main Draw
 Qualifying Draw

Pekao Szczecin Open - Singles
2014 Singles
2014 in Polish tennis